Lim Siew Khim is a Malaysian politician from DAP. She has been the Member of Penang State Legislative Assembly for Sungai Pinang since 2013.

Politics 
She is the Women Chief of DAP and PH Penang.

Election result

External links

References 

Democratic Action Party (Malaysia) politicians
Members of the Penang State Legislative Assembly
Malaysian people of Chinese descent
Malaysian politicians of Chinese descent
Living people
Year of birth missing (living people)